Jason Wing (born 12 October 1965) is a British bobsledder who competed in the mid-1990s.

Sporting career
Wing's first sporting success was as a junior long jumper and sprinter and he featured in the national rankings from 1980 to 1989. His best performances were 10.7 seconds for the 100m and 7.38m in the long jump. During his time as a student Wing was British College's Long Jump champion on three occasions from 1985 to 1989. During his time as an athlete he was coached by the 1980 Olympic 100m Alan Wells who introduced Wing to the sport of bobsleigh. Due to his size and speed Wing was an immediate success at the sport and was quickly promoted to the Great Britain team to compete on the World Cup circuit of competitions. Wing was selected for the squad to compete at the 1992 Olympic Games in La Plagne, France but instead chose to pursue a professional career in Rugby League.  Wing returned to bobsleigh for the 1994 Winter Olympics in Lillehammer where he finished fifth in the four-man event for GB1 team piloted by Mark Tout.  He also gained a silver medal at the 1994 European Championships (four-man) in La Plange, France as well as gaining silver and bronze medals during the 1993/4 World Cup circuit in Altenberg, Germany and St Moritz, Switzerland. After a two-year break from bobsleigh competition Wing again returned to the sport and was selected for the GB squad for the 1998 Winter Olympics in Nagano but he suffered a career ending injury to his thigh whilst competing in a World Cup race in Calgary, Canada. 
As a teenager Wing played Rugby Union for Cambridgeshire Colts before being introduced to Rugby League during his time at Borough Road PE College in west London. During his time at Borough Road Wing represented the British College's side before being selected to play for a Great Britain students against France. He went on to play professional Rugby League for London Crusaders in 1991-1993 and was regarded as an extremely pacy and powerful winger and prolific try scorer.

Teaching career
Wing is a career schoolteacher and has taught PE since 1989. Educated at Neale-Wade School, he taught at several schools including Witchford Village College, Isleworth and Syon School and Gunnersbury School for Boys. During his time at Isleworth and Syon he successfully led on the school's bid for Specialist Sports College status in 2003. Under his leadership as Director of Sport the school won the prestigious Sports College of the Year award in 2005. Wing coached a number of high performing athletes during his time as a PE teacher including England International sprinter Chris Craig, professional basketball players Joe Fournier and Walid Mumuni and Watford FC player Michael Bryan. 
He returned to his former school Neale-Wade as principal in 2011. Wing was appointed as Executive Headteacher for both Neale-Wade and Burrowmoor Primary School in May 2015, both schools are sponsored by The Active Learning Trust. From September 2016 Wing will extend his Executive Headteacher role and will have responsibility for both of his current schools and the new Active Learning Trust school in Littleport, Cambridgeshire. Littleport East Cambs Academy (LECA) will open in September 2017 and Wing will lead on the establishment of this new academy. In June 2017 Wing was shortlisted for the TES Headteacher of Year Award and in the same month he was awarded National Leader of Education status and Neale-Wade was in turn was designated as a National Support School.
Wing has contributed to educational articles for Secondary Ed Magazine, Academy Today, Schools Week, The Guardian and Parent Dish.

References

 1994 bobsleigh four-man results
 British Olympic Association profile

1965 births
Bobsledders at the 1994 Winter Olympics
British male bobsledders
Olympic bobsledders of Great Britain
Living people